Crossroads (French: Carrefour) is a 1938 French drama film directed by Curtis Bernhardt and starring Charles Vanel, Jules Berry and Suzy Prim. It inspired two English-language remakes, the 1940 British film Dead Man's Shoes and Hollywood's Crossroads in 1942.

It was shot at the Billancourt Studios in Paris and on location in the city. The film's sets were designed by the art director Jean d'Eaubonne and Raymond Gabutti.

Synopsis
A wealthy industrialist is accused in court of being in reality a petty criminal who deserted from the French Army twenty years before during the First World War.

Cast
 Charles Vanel as Roger de Vétheuil 
 Jules Berry as Lucien Sarroux 
 Suzy Prim as Michèle Allain 
 Tania Fédor as Anna de Vétheuil 
 Marcelle Géniat as Mme. Pelletier 
 Jean Claudio as Paul de Vétheuil 
 Annie France as L'entraîneuse 
 Pierre Palau as Leduc - le 1er maître-chanteur 
 Marcel Melrac as Un gendarme 
 Paul Amiot as Le président 
 Christian Argentin as Anwalt, l'avocat 
 Eddy Debray as Un accusé 
 Jean Tissier as L'employé de l'agence de voyage 
 Auguste Bovério as Pierre 
 Marcel Duhamel as Le domestique 
 Gustave Gallet as Le chirurgien 
 Denise Kerny as La caissière 
 Liliane Lesaffre as La concierge 
 Albert Malbert as Le concierge 
 Marcel Pérès as Le préposé au tribunal
 Robert Rollis as Un élève 
 Otto Wallburg as Le médecin allemand

References

Bibliography 
 Ruth Barton. Hedy Lamarr: The Most Beautiful Woman in Film. University Press of Kentucky, 2010.

External links 
 

1938 films
French drama films
1938 drama films
1930s French-language films
Films directed by Curtis Bernhardt
French black-and-white films
Films set in Paris
Films shot in Paris
Films shot at Billancourt Studios
1930s French films